Eclipse Award for Outstanding Owner is an American Thoroughbred horse racing honor for racehorse owners. Created in 1971, it is part of the Eclipse Awards program and is awarded annually.

Past winners: 
1971 : Mr. & Mrs. E. E. Fogelson
1972 : No award
1973 : No award
1974 : Dan Lasater
1975 : Dan Lasater
1976 : Dan Lasater
1977 : Maxwell Gluck
1978 : Harbor View Farm
1979 : Harbor View Farm
1980 : Bertram & Diana Firestone
1981 : Dotsam Stable
1982 : Viola Sommer
1983 : John A. Franks
1984 : John A. Franks
1985 : Mr. & Mrs. Gene Klein
1986 : Mr. & Mrs. Gene Klein
1987 : Mr. & Mrs. Gene Klein
1988 : Ogden Phipps
1989 : Ogden Phipps
1990 : Frances A. Genter
1991 : Sam-Son Farm
1992 : Juddmonte Farms
1993 : John A. Franks
1994 : John A. Franks
1995 : Allen E. Paulson

1996 : Allen E. Paulson
1997 : Carolyn Hine
1998 : Frank Stronach
1999 : Frank Stronach
2000 : Frank Stronach
2001 : Richard A. Englander
2002 : Richard A. Englander
2003 : Juddmonte Farms
2004 : Kenneth and Sarah Ramsey
2005 : Michael J. Gill
2006 : Lael Stables & Darley Stables (tied)
2007 : Shadwell Stable
2008 : Stronach Stables
2009 : Godolphin Racing
2010 : WinStar Farm
2011 : Kenneth and Sarah Ramsey
2012 : Godolphin Racing
2013 : Kenneth and Sarah Ramsey
2014 : Kenneth and Sarah Ramsey
2015 : Zayat Stables
2016 : Juddmonte Farms
2017 : Juddmonte Farms
2018 : Hronis Racing
2019 : Klaravich Stables and William H. Lawrence
2020 : Godolphin
2021 : Godolphin
2022 : Godolphin

References
 The Eclipse Awards at the Thoroughbred Racing Associations of America, Inc.
 The Bloodhorse.com Champion's history charts

 
 
Horse racing awards
Horse racing in the United States